Ma mère l'Oye (English: Mother Goose, literally "My Mother the Goose") is a suite by French composer Maurice Ravel. The piece was originally written as a five-movement piano duet in 1910. In 1911, Ravel orchestrated the work.

Piano versions
Ravel originally wrote Ma mère l'Oye as a piano duet for the Godebski children, Mimi and Jean, ages 6 and 7. Ravel dedicated this work for four hands to the children (just as he had dedicated an earlier work, Sonatine, to their parents). Jeanne Leleu and Geneviève Durony premiered the work at the first concert of the Société musicale indépendante on 20 April 1910.

The piece was transcribed for solo piano by Ravel's friend Jacques Charlot the same year as it was published (1910); the first movement of Ravel's Le tombeau de Couperin was also dedicated to Charlot's memory after his death in World War I.

Both piano versions bear the subtitle "cinq pièces enfantines" (five children's pieces). The five pieces are:

 Pavane de la Belle au bois dormant: Lent (Pavane of Sleeping Beauty)
 Petit Poucet: Très modéré (Little Tom Thumb / Hop-o'-My-Thumb)
 Laideronnette, impératrice des pagodes: Mouvt de marche (Little Ugly Girl, Empress of the Pagodas)
 Les entretiens de la belle et de la bête: Mouvt de valse très modéré (Conversation of Beauty and the Beast)
 Le jardin féerique: Lent et grave (The Fairy Garden)

Sleeping Beauty and Little Tom Thumb are based on the tales of Charles Perrault, while Little Ugly Girl, Empress of the Pagodas is inspired by a tale (The Green Serpent) by Perrault's "rival" Madame d'Aulnoy. Beauty and the Beast is based upon the version by Jeanne-Marie Le Prince de Beaumont. The origin of The Fairy Garden is not entirely known, although the ballet version interprets this as Sleeping Beauty being awakened in the garden by her prince. 

On several of the scores, Ravel included quotes to indicate clearly what he is trying to invoke. For example, for the second piece, he writes:

Orchestrated version
In 1911, Ravel orchestrated the five-piece suite. This form is the most frequently heard today.

Later the same year, he also expanded it into a ballet, separating the five initial pieces with four new interludes and adding two movements at the start, Prélude and Danse du rouet et scène. The ballet premiered on 29 January 1912 at the Théâtre des Arts in Paris. The eleven numbers are:

Instrumentation
Ma mère l'Oye is scored for an orchestra with the following instruments:

Woodwinds
2 flutes (2nd doubling piccolo)
2 oboes (2nd doubling cor anglais)
2 clarinets in B and A
2 bassoons (2nd doubling contrabassoon)

Brass
2 horns in F

Percussion
timpani

bass drum
cymbals
triangle
tamtam
glockenspiel
xylophone

Keyboards
celesta
jeu de timbre

Strings

harp

violins I, II
violas
cellos
double basses

In popular culture
 On his 1974 album, So What, American guitarist Joe Walsh recorded the first piano movement, which he simply titled "Pavanne", on the synthesizer.
 On his 1980 album, Bolero (also titled The Ravel Album), Japanese synthesizer artist Isao Tomita recorded the five movements of the piano version.
 In the 1984 TV short Jean Shepherd on Route 1... and Other Major Thoroughfares, an orchestral version of Le jardin féerique plays in the background while Shepherd narrates a segment about U.S. Route 22.
 The 1993 album Audrey Hepburn's Enchanted Tales includes selections from the suite.
In the 2007 anime  Clannad, the characters choose "Ma mére l'oye" (more specifically a section of "Petit Poucet: Très modéré") as the background music for their school play.
 The 2017 film Call Me by Your Name makes extensive use of a section of Le jardin féerique,
 In the 2021 film The Worst Person in the World, a section of Les entretiens de la belle et de la bete plays while Julie freezes time to meet with Eivind at a cafe.
 The Korean Drama "Sky Castle" (2018-2019) employs Bolero and The Fairy Garden throughout the 20 episode saga.

References

External links 
 
Free recording by the Columbia University Orchestra.
Free recording of Ma mère l'Oye by Felipe Sarro

Suites by Maurice Ravel
Orchestral suites
Compositions for solo piano
Compositions for piano four-hands
Ballets by Maurice Ravel
1912 ballet premieres
1910 compositions
1911 compositions
1912 compositions
Music based on fairy tales
Works based on nursery rhymes
Music with dedications
Ballets based on works by Charles Perrault